Ben Jones may refer to:

In sports

Australia
Ben Jones (Australian rugby league, born 1980), Australian rugby league player for the Canberra Raiders
Ben Jones (Australian rugby league, born 1990), Australian rugby league player for the North Queensland Cowboys

Canada
Ben Jones (ice hockey) (born 1999)

United Kingdom
Ben Jones (footballer, born 1880) (1880–?), English soccer player
Benny Jones (footballer, born 1907),see 1931–32 Rochdale A.F.C. season
Ben Jones (footballer, born 1992), Welsh football player
Benjamin Jones (cyclist) (1882–1963), British 1908 Olympic gold medalist and Empire Games champion
Ben Jones (rugby union, born 1983), English rugby union player, currently playing for Worcester Warriors
Ben Jones (English rugby league) (born 1988), English rugby league player for York City Knights
Ben Jones (rugby union, born 1998), Welsh rugby union player
Ben Jones-Bishop (born 1988), English rugby league player for Leeds Rhinos
Reuben Jones (1932–1990), British athlete

United States
Ben A. Jones (1882–1961), American thoroughbred horse trainer
Ben Jones (halfback) (1899–1929), American football halfback
Ben Jones (offensive lineman) (born 1989), American football offensive lineman
Ben Jones (racing driver) (1903–1938), American racecar driver

In the arts
Ben Jones (American actor and politician) (born 1941), American actor and politician
Ben Jones (British actor) (born 1972), British actor
Ben Jones (American cartoonist) (born 1977), member of the collective Paper Rad
Ben Jones (DJ) (born 1977), British radio DJ
Ben Jones (musician) (born 1982), English singer, songwriter, musician and producer
Ben York Jones (born 1984), American actor and screenwriter

Other
Ben Jones (co-operator) (1847–1942), British co-operative and political activist
Ben Jones (Grenadian politician) (1924–2005), Grenadian politician
Ben Jones (Welsh solicitor) (1914–1989), Welsh solicitor and Liberal Party politician
Benjamin Jones (economist) (born 1972), professor at Kellogg School of Management
Benjamin F. Jones (born 1966), American historian and academic administrator
Detective Sergeant Ben Jones, leading character in the British TV series Midsomer Murders

See also
Benjamin Jones (disambiguation)